Biliavyntsi is a village in Chortkiv Raion (district) of Ternopil Oblast (province) in western Ukraine. It belongs to Buchach urban hromada, one of the hromadas of Ukraine. The Strypa River flows through of the village. The population of the  village was 624 in 2001.

History 

First written mention comes from the 17th century. Then  belonged to the Polish–Lithuanian Commonwealth, from 1772 until 1918 to Austrian (Habsburg monarchy, Austrian Empire, Austria-Hungary) empires, in 1918-1919 to West Ukrainian People's Republic. From 1991 belonged to Ukraine. 

Reading room of Ukrainian society Prosvita operated in the village.

Solomiya Krushelnytska, one of the brightest soprano opera stars of the first half of the 20th century, was born in the village.

Until 18 July 2020, Biliavyntsi belonged to Buchach Raion. The raion was abolished in July 2020 as part of the administrative reform of Ukraine, which reduced the number of raions of Ternopil Oblast to three. The area of Buchach Raion was merged into Chortkiv Raion.

Attractions 

 Church of St. Trinity (1909)
 Chapel (1849)
 Bell tower, wooden

References

Notes

Sources

External links 

Villages in Chortkiv Raion